The Howard T. Markey National Courts Building (formerly the National Courts Building) is a courthouse in Washington, D.C., which houses the United States Court of Federal Claims and the United States Court of Appeals for the Federal Circuit. It is located at 717 Madison Place NW, east of Lafayette Square and north of the White House, and borders the Freedman's Bank Building to the south, Benjamin Ogle Tayloe House at 721 Madison Place NW, the former Cosmos Club building at 725 Madison Place NW, and the Cutts-Madison House at 1520 H Street NW.

History 
Originally, the plan for the courthouse and an office building for White House staff had called for the historic houses on both sides of Lafayette Square to be razed. First Lady Jacqueline Kennedy, a believer in historic preservation, urged President John F. Kennedy to find an alternative solution. Kennedy tapped architect John Carl Warnecke to come up with a plan to preserve the houses. Warnecke and Jacqueline Kennedy envisioned that the courthouse and the New Executive Office Building, a twin structure to be built on the other side of Lafayette Square, would form a backdrop for the historic houses. The two buildings remain distinctive in their own right.

The Building Committee included Chief Judge John Marvin Jones, Commissioner Marion T. Bennett, and Chief Commissioner Arnold Wilson Cowen. The building was dedicated on September 20, 1967.

The courthouse was initially built for the United States Court of Customs and Patent Appeals and the United States Court of Claims, so when the two courts were abolished and merged to create the Federal Circuit in 1982, they already had a domicile in common. 

In 1998, President Bill Clinton signed legislation renaming the National Courts Building after Howard Thomas Markey. The re-dedication celebration was held on October 23, 1998, during a special joint session of the Court of Appeals for the Federal Circuit and the Court of Federal Claims.

See also
 Lafayette Square Historic District (Washington, D.C.)

References

Courthouses in Washington, D.C.
Buildings of the United States government in Washington, D.C.
Federal courthouses in the United States
United States Court of Federal Claims
United States Court of Appeals for the Federal Circuit